Pole Vault Stars is an annual indoor pole vaulting competition which is typically held in February at the Druzhba Palace of Sports in Donetsk, Ukraine. The meeting was founded in 1990 by Sergey Bubka, the pole vault world record holder who grew up in the city. Bubka brought an end to his distinguished career with a ceremony at the competition in 2001.

History
The meeting traces its history back to 1990, when Bubka set a world indoor record mark of 6.05 m. He went on to set two further world indoor records at the meet, clearing 6.11 m at the second edition in 1991 and then setting a world indoor record of 6.15 m in 1993.  After standing for almost 21 years, in 2014 Renaud Lavillenie improved upon Bubka's record at Pole Vault Stars.  Russian athlete Yelena Isinbayeva continued the event's record breaking traditions with two world record performances upon her first appearance in 2004. She set a new world record at the meet every year from 2004 to 2009. The Russian broke the women's indoor record twice at the 2009 meeting.

Zepter International was a long-time title sponsor of the event. The meeting's current commercial partner, Samsung, has been the title sponsor since 2011.

Days after the 2014 event, where Lavillenie set the new world record, the city of Donesk became the epicenter of what became the War in Donbass.  The continued situation has cancelled subsequent events.

Past winners

Key:

References

External links
Sergey Bubka official website 
Meet profile from European Athletics

Athletics competitions in Ukraine
Recurring sporting events established in 1990
Annual indoor track and field meetings
Pole vault
Sport in Donetsk
1990 establishments in Ukraine